The Drifters is a novel by Pulitzer Prize-winning author James A. Michener, published in 1971 by Random House. The novel follows six young characters from diverse backgrounds and various countries as their paths meet and they travel together through parts of Spain, Portugal, Morocco and Mozambique. The story is told from the perspective of the narrator, George Fairbanks, who is an investment analyst for the fictional company World Mutual Bank in Switzerland. Mr. Fairbanks is connected with nearly every character in some way, and they all seem to open up to him throughout the novel in one way or another.

Plot summary

Chapter I: Joe
In the first chapter, Joe is introduced as a disenfranchised twenty-year-old youth who is enrolled at the University of California during the Vietnam War. After Joe realizes that with his grades he is going to get drafted, he hitchhikes to Yale University, where he gets the name of a professor who may be able to get him across the border into Canada. After being referred to a woman in Boston named Gretchen, she helps him get into Canada, and he eventually goes to Torremolinos, Spain. While looking for a job and a place to stay, he takes over the ownership of a bar called The Alamo, and a man named Jean-Victor finds him a place to stay in Torremolinos.

Chapter II: Britta
In keeping with the theme throughout the book, the second chapter is about the character Britta, an 18-year-old girl from Tromsø, Norway. After finishing school, she finds a job in an office at the docks, but eventually becomes curious about the world beyond Tromsø, and goes to vacation in Torremolinos, Spain for fifteen days. Once in Torremolinos, she loves it and finds a job as a waitress in a bar called The Alamo. Here, a man named Jean-Victor finds her a place to stay, where another newcomer to Torremolinos, Joe, is already staying.

Chapter III: Monica
Of the main characters in the book, Monica goes through trials and tribulations as she transitions from living as royalty in a foreign country to being forced out and finally finding her way to Torremolinos to join the rest of the cast in the book. She is introduced as living with her father in the Republic of Vwarda, where Monica becomes rebellious and begins to cause a stir in Vwarda's Royal Family. She is forced out of the country and runs away with an airline pilot to Torremolinos, where she can live on her monthly allowance from her grandmother. She meets a man named Jean-Victor, who finds her a place to live with a woman from Norway and a man from the United States.

Chapter IV: Cato
The fourth character of the book is Cato; he is introduced as the son of the Reverend Claypool Jackson, a local minister in the area trying to salvage his community through his church. Cato Jackson is a sophomore at University of Pennsylvania, whom the narrator meets at a drugstore where he stumbles upon a shooting of a local drugstore owner. After meeting Mr. Fairbanks, he and Cato talk all night and the next day, after Cato's girlfriend is stabbed and killed. Cato then runs off to Torremolinos, where he finds shelter in an apartment with a few other runaways of his own age.

Chapter V: Yigal
In the fifth chapter of the book, the character Yigal is introduced as the son of a dean at a college in Haifa, Israel. He is struggling to identify with either his parents and their life in Israel, or with his grandfather and his American life in Detroit, Michigan in the United States, and his other grandfather in England. He is shuffled between Israel and America throughout his youth, and even fights and becomes a hero in the Six-Day War, before finally enrolling in Technion University in Haifa. After a few months he moves back to England with his other grandfather and begins to engage in a lot of reading and in conversations with his grandfather. Eventually his grandfather suggests that he needs to spend some time away, and he suggests the south of Spain, and Torremolinos, as a place to go.

Chapter VI: Gretchen
Gretchen is introduced as a very intelligent girl from Boston who, at the age of 19, has already completed her bachelor's degree, and is working for senator Eugene McCarthy's presidential campaign. After campaigning across the United States for McCarthy's nomination in Chicago at the Democratic Convention, during the riots she and the people she is with are falsely arrested. During the process she is sexually assaulted, but the policemen who did it deny it, and nothing is ever done about it. After fighting with her parents and the police over the issue of what happened, she decides to go to school in Besançon, France, where one of her professors tells her about an excellent language school. Upon enrolling at the University of Besançon and living with her peers for a little while, she decides to travel. Someone suggests Torremolinos, so she buys a yellow pop-top van and begins to live out of it in Torremolinos.

Chapter VII: Torremolinos
At the beginning of chapter seven, the whole set of characters are all in Torremolinos, and everyone is getting settled in with their various living conditions. Cato and Monica begin a relationship, and some of the characters begin to experiment with drugs such as LSD; they continue to smoke large amounts of marijuana and drink regularly. During this time, they go to Paxton Fell's house, a man whom a few of the characters were referenced to see in case of an emergency. Everyone, including Mr. Fairbanks, who is in Torremolinos to supervise a real estate deal, end up partying with Mr. Fell and a few of his guests throughout the night. Eventually, during their stay, the characters are approached by a woman, Susan Elgerton, who tries to convince Cato and Gretchen to join her in the name of starting a violent revolution back in America. As time goes on, Torremolinos begins to lose its luster; Monica is partying too much for her own good and Gretchen starts to look for something else to entertain her, and the characters leave Torremolinos in Gretchen's yellow pop-top and head towards Portugal.

Chapter VIII: Algarve
As they drive towards the Algarve, the characters begin to notice that not everywhere in Europe is so nice as Torremolinos. They eventually find a small town by the name of Alte. Here, Yigal meets a local girl whom he kisses, upsetting the rest of the village, and Monica and Cato keep on going to the nearby town of Albufeira to take doses of LSD with a local bar owner, where Gretchen also tries it for the first time and unfortunately has a really bad trip. Eventually the group moves on to the seaside town of Algarve. After living in Algarve for a while, Monica tries to run away to Nepal, but Joe, Yigal and Cato end up getting into a fight with the people with whom she was going to run away. She returns, and the crew heads off to Pamplona, Spain with Mr. Fairbanks.

Chapter IX: The Tech Rep
In the ninth chapter, a new character is introduced by the name of Harvey Holt. He works as a technical representative on radars in remote locations. He is an old friend of Mr. Fairbanks, and has been everywhere; from Afghanistan to Sumatra to Thailand. He is a fan of old music and movies. He is very old-fashioned, and in a break from the rest of the characters in the book, he isn't vehemently anti-war, as he had served in World War II. He very much disapproves of how Joe dodged the draft to travel the world. Harvey's old music tapes include the vocalist Bea Wain; her recording of "My Reverie", discussed in two separate chapters, serves as a symbol of the generation gap.

Chapter X: Pamplona
Pamplona is known for its Running of the Bulls, an event characters come to see. They stay in the same hotel as Mr. Fairbanks and Harvey Holt, and there are many conversations between Mr. Holt and Joe about commitment to one's country. Here, Gretchen starts to show her feelings for Clive, a recurring character throughout the book who brings news from the outside world as well as new music from his homeland in England. For a week, everybody enjoys themselves, and Joe begins to think that he also wants to run with the bulls with Harvey at some point. During the week, Yigal's American grandfather tracks him down and tries to bring him back to Detroit with him, although he is torn because he doesn't like America, although something in it still has him interested. In the end, he leaves to go to school at Case Western Reserve in Ohio. During the run, Harvey gets gored by a bull but survives. Joe and even Mr. Fairbanks run, and the gang decides next to leave Europe and head to Mozambique for the next leg of their journey.

Chapter XI: Mozambique
In Mozambique things begin to go downhill for Monica: she has moved beyond LSD, begins to use heroin regularly, starts to bring Cato down with her, and gets Joe to try heroin on occasion. Cato hangs around the local historians in the area, and begins to learn about the history of Africa, and the effect slavery has had on the continent. As quick as Cato is to point out how badly the Christians have treated the Arabs, Mr. Fairbanks and Gretchen are quick to point out how much the Arabs used slavery against their own people in the past. The group also explores some of the natural beauty of Mozambique, and starts to reconnect with that side of the world, which is something they have not explored thus far on their journey. The group then decides to head to Marrakesh, Morocco, where there is a man who could help out Joe with some papers, so he could re-enter the United States at some point, and not be considered a criminal.

Chapter XII: Marrakesh
In the final destination of the journey, the remainder of the group ends up in Marrakesh, Morocco, where the marijuana trade is booming, a town where young people could get lost very easily. The group finds a place to stay at a hotel, where on the top floor there is a man who can help out Joe with his papers, and helps out people who become addicted to heroin, which makes it a good fit for Monica. Monica is becoming more addicted to heroin, and things are starting to look bad for her. Her father has all but given up hope for her, and the rest of the group is beginning to split up; Britta and Harvey fly off to Ratmalana, and Monica runs away more often than before. Eventually, Monica dies from an infection caused by her heroin use, Britta leaves with Harvey, Cato begins his trip to Mecca hoping to return to Philadelphia, Joe goes off to Tokyo and Gretchen returns home to Boston.

Fictional and real places
One of the most important aspects of the book is the places to which the characters travel; some of the places that the characters travel to, and originate from, are fictional.

Fictional places
 Republic of Vwarda
 Qarash Pass
 Zambela Game Sanctuary
 The Alamo in Torremolinos
 Bar Vasca in Pamplona
 World Mutual Bank in Switzerland

Real places
 Torremolinos, Spain
 Pamplona, Spain
 Silves, Portugal
 Besançon, France
 Alte, Portugal
 Algarve, Portugal
 Mozambique Island, Mozambique  
 Boston, Massachusetts, United States of America
 Philadelphia, Pennsylvania, United States of America
 Marrakesh, Morocco
 Ratmalana, Sri Lanka.

Real events
 Vietnam War
 1968 Democratic National Convention and related protest activity
 Six-Day War

Character list

Main characters
 Joe
 Britta
 Monica
 Cato
 Yigal
 Gretchen
 George Fairbanks
 Harvey Holt

Secondary characters
 Reverend Claypool Jackson
 Jemail
 Sir Charles Braham
 Jean-Victor
 Big Loomis
 Clive
 Mr. Melnikoff
 Mr. Clifton
 Hajj
 Akbar Muhammad

Reception  
The book was a commercial success, ranking as one of the ten best-selling novels of 1971. 

The New York Times' book critic Thomas Lask found the novel superficial and lacking in character insight, stating that Michener "...is not investigating the states of mind of those suffering from existential anxiety, of those fundamentally alienated from the world. He is setting down the log of a number of people who think they may be able to solve some problems by postponing consideration of them...those interested in knowing how a sympathetic member of the older generation views some of the shenanigans of the younger will find “The Drifters” a tolerable interlude, especially as it is spiced with travelogue evocations of foreign climes." 

A review in The Hartford Courant stated that "Overall, Michener has produced a fine work, a lively and entertaining examination of the New Society's would-be solutions to old society problems", while noting that "the drifters never launch into meaningless diatribes against society, as expatriates are wont to do...instead, they fly into carefully controlled rages, which at times seem highly unrealistic."

References

 Michener, James. The Drifters: A Novel. New York: Random House, 1971. Print.
 "20th-Century American Bestsellers". Welcome to the ISRL. Web. 02 Nov. 2009.

External links
Synopsis of publication history and critical reactions;  Archive URL (October 9, 2011)
Mapping the drifters: Free love and the Costa del Sol travel bug. Jared Garland, The Olive Press, 8 August 2014.

1971 American novels
Historical novels
Novels by James A. Michener
Random House books
Novels about heroin addiction
Novels set in the 1960s
Novels set in Spain
Novels set in Portugal
Novels set in Morocco
Novels set in Mozambique